Ralph Fiennes is an English actor of the stage and screen who has received many awards and nominations over the course of his career.

He has received two Academy Award nominations for his performances in Steven Spielberg's holocaust drama Schindler's List (1993) and in Anthony Minghella's epic romantic drama The English Patient (1996). For his work on television he also received a Primetime Emmy Award for his performance in Bernard and Doris (2008). He also has received nominations for his work on stage including two Tony Awards including a win for Hamlet in 1995 and a nomination for Faith Healer in 2006. He has also received six British Academy Film Award nominations, six Golden Globe Award nominations, and four Screen Actors Guild Award nominations.

Major associations

Academy Awards

Emmy Awards

Tony Awards

Industry awards

British Academy Film Awards

Golden Globe Awards

Screen Actors Guild Awards

Other awards

Annie Awards

Saturn Awards

Honorary award

References 

Fiennes, Ralph